The year 2014 is the 11th year in the history of the Konfrontacja Sztuk Walki, a mixed martial arts promotion based in Poland. In 2014 Konfrontacja Sztuk Walki held 4 events beginning with, KSW 26: Materla vs. Silva III.

List of events

KSW 26: Materla vs. Silva 3

KSW 26 was a mixed martial arts event held on March 22, 2014 at the Torwar Hall in Warsaw, Poland.

Background

Results

KSW 27: Cage Time

KSW 27: Cage Time was a mixed martial arts event held on May 17, 2014 at the Ergo Arena in Gdańsk, Poland .

Background

It was the first event promoted by KSW where the traditional white ring was replaced by a circular cage which became the new standard for future Polish MMA events.

Results

KSW 28: Fighters Den

KSW 28: Fighters Den was a mixed martial arts event held on October 4, 2014 at the Hala Widowiskowo-Sportowa in Szczecin, Poland.

Background

Results

KSW 29: Reload

KSW 29: Reload was a mixed martial arts event held on December 6, 2014 at the Kraków Arena in Kraków, Poland.

Background

Results

References

2014 in mixed martial arts
Konfrontacja Sztuk Walki events
Konfrontacja Sztuk Walki events